Scoparia monticola is a moth in the family Crambidae. It was described by Nuss in 1998. It is found in the Philippines (Mindanao).

References

Moths described in 1998
Scorparia